The UK parliamentary constituency of Seaford was a Cinque Port constituency, similar to a parliamentary borough, in Seaford, East Sussex. A rotten borough, prone by size to undue influence by a patron, it was disenfranchised in the Reform Act of 1832. It was notable for having returned three Prime Ministers as its members – Henry Pelham, who represented the town from 1717 to 1722, William Pitt the Elder from 1747 to 1754 and George Canning in 1827 – though only Canning was Prime Minister while representing Seaford.

History

Enfranchisement and re-establishment
Seaford was a Cinque Port constituency, which was technically a separate category although in practice it was to all intents and purposes a parliamentary borough. The Cinque Ports were not under the jurisdiction of the counties in which they stood, and as a result were not represented in the earliest English parliaments because the boroughs were chosen by sheriffs from the towns within their counties. However, Seaford itself was not one of the seven Cinque Ports, and was summoned to send members to the Parliament of 1298 while they – including the much more important town of Hastings of which Seaford was theoretically a subordinate part – remained unrepresented.

Seaford continued to return MPs on an irregular basis for a century, by which time the seven Cinque Ports had also been enfranchised, but ceased to do so after 1399. In 1544, Henry VIII granted the town a charter as a port in its own right, separate from Hastings, but it was another 97 years before its right to elect MPs was restored, by a resolution of the Long Parliament on 4 February 1641. This made it one of the last boroughs to be acquire the right to vote before the Great Reform Act – only Newark and Durham, enfranchised during the reign of Charles II, came later. The Commons resolution stated that Seaford "shall be restored to that its ancient Privilege of sending Burgesses to Parliament", implying that Seaford was to be regarded as a borough (the representatives of Cinque Ports were referred to as "barons" rather than "burgesses"), but Seaford was nevertheless treated subsequently as a cinque port constituency.

Boundaries, franchise and patronage
The borough consisted of the parish of Seaford, a small town which had ceased to have much value as a port after the destruction of its harbour by storms at the end of the 16th century. At the time of the Reform Act in 1832, its population was just over 1,000, and the town contained 201 houses.

Like most small boroughs in the Unreformed Parliament, Seaford came under the influence of a series of "patrons" (local magnates who were allowed to choose both the borough's MPs in return for favours to the town and the voters); but, as in the other cinque ports, there was also a powerful government interest, since a large number of the voters were employed as customs and excise officers. From before the end of the 17th century, the Pelham family could generally nominate one of the two MPs. However, the personal influence of the Pelhams became so intertwined with government patronage during the administrations of Henry Pelham and his brother the Duke of Newcastle that Namier argues that when Newcastle went into opposition in 1762 the new government might easily have turned Seaford into a permanent "Treasury borough", had it made efforts to do so.

The right to vote was at first restricted to the freemen of the town, but a decision of the House of Commons after a disputed election in 1671 pronounced that the right to vote extended to "the populacy", which was taken in practice to mean all resident householders paying scot and lot. (This interpretation was re-affirmed by the Commons following another disputed election in 1792.) This was, nevertheless, a restrictive franchise in a town that was not prosperous, and there were only 94 qualified voters in 1831. Indeed, during the 18th century the Duke of Newcastle deliberately restricted the number of voters to those on whose loyalties he could depend, and successfully resisted an election petition in 1761 which would have widened the electorate to include all inhabitants not receiving alms. (This would have enfranchised many poorer voters which the petitioner, defeated candidate George Medley, hoped would be amenable to bribery.) Newcastle's control depended on his having a majority on the town corporation, which was responsible for rating inhabitants for scot and lot and therefore could exclude an inhabitant from voting simply by declaring him not liable to the local tax.

After Newcastle's death the Treasury initially gained complete control of Seaford, but the disfranchisement of the customs officers by Crewe's Act in 1782 reduced the electorate to 24, leaving the majority finely balanced. Throughout the 1780s a struggle for control continued, fought out both through a series of election petitions in the House of Commons and by legal action against the corporation at the quarter sessions. Oldfield, the contemporary historian of electoral abuses, was one of the agents engaged in this contest, and details its course at length. The excluded residents eventually won their right to be rated for scot and lot, and with it their votes, while non-resident honorary freemen created by the corporation were excluded, and the government influence thereafter was minimal.

In the early 19th century the patrons were John Leach and Charles Rose Ellis, who used his influence to occupy one of the seats himself for many years; his elevation to the peerage as Lord Seaford in 1826 may have owed not a little to his commanding a seat in the House of Commons.

Abolition
Seaford was too small a borough to survive the Reform Act, and lost both its MPs. From 1832, the town was included in the Eastern Sussex county division.

Members of Parliament

Seaford was re-enfranchised by Parliament in 1640

Notes

References
 
 D Brunton & D H Pennington, Members of the Long Parliament (London: George Allen & Unwin, 1954)
 Cobbett's Parliamentary history of England, from the Norman Conquest in 1066 to the year 1803 (London: Thomas Hansard, 1808) 
 T. H. B. Oldfield, The Representative History of Great Britain and Ireland (London: Baldwin, Cradock & Joy, 1816)
 J Holladay Philbin, Parliamentary Representation 1832 – England and Wales (New Haven: Yale University Press, 1965)
 Henry Stooks Smith, "The Parliaments of England from 1715 to 1847" (2nd edition, edited by FWS Craig – Chichester: Parliamentary Reference Publications, 1973)
 Frederic A Youngs, jr, Guide to the Local Administrative Units of England, Vol I (London: Royal Historical Society, 1979)

Parliamentary constituencies in South East England (historic)
Constituencies of the Parliament of the United Kingdom represented by a sitting Prime Minister
Constituencies of the Parliament of the United Kingdom established in 1641
Constituencies of the Parliament of the United Kingdom disestablished in 1832
Rotten boroughs
Cinque ports parliament constituencies
Seaford, East Sussex